The Portrait is a 1915 Russian film directed by Ladislas Starevich. Only 8 minutes of 45 minutes of the film still exist today.

Plot 

The film tells about a man who acquires a portrait of an old man, hangs him on a wall in his house and tries to fall asleep, but for some reason he cannot, as a result of which he decides to hang a portrait. And suddenly the old man comes out of the picture and starts  to the main character...

Cast 
 Andrey Gromov
 Ivan Lazarev

References 

1915 films
1910s Russian-language films
Russian drama films